Castelvecchio, an Italian word meaning "Old castle", may refer to:

Places in Italy

Municipalities
Castelvecchio Calvisio, in the Province of L'Aquila, Abruzzo
Castelvecchio di Rocca Barbena, in the Province of Savona, Liguria
Castelvecchio Subequo, in the Province of L'Aquila, Abruzzo

Civil parishes
Castelvecchio (Carmignano), in the municipality of Carmignano (PO), Tuscany
Castelvecchio (Monte Porzio), in the municipality of Monte Porzio (PU), Marche
, in the municipality of Pescia (PT), Tuscany
, in the municipality of Preci (PG), Umbria
, uninhabited, in the municipality of San Gimignano (SI), Tuscany
Castelvecchio (Valdagno), in the municipality of Valdagno (VI), Veneto
Castelvecchio Pascoli, in the municipality of Barga (LU), Tuscany

Other

 Castelvecchio, the earliest part of Buonconsiglio Castle, Trento, Italy
 , the ancient heart of the city of Siena, Italy
, a castle in Siusi, Italy
 Castelvecchio (Castel Goffredo), the ancient heart of the city of Castel Goffredo, Italy
Castelvecchio (Verona), a castle in Verona, Italy
Castelvecchio Museum, a museum in Verona, Italy
Kaštel Stari (it.: Castelvecchio), a village in the municipality of Kaštela, Split-Dalmatia County

See also